William David Reeves (born 18 December 1996) is a Welsh professional footballer who plays as a midfielder for  side Leek Town.

He began his career at Port Vale in April 2015, and later went out on loan to Witton Albion, Hyde United and Stafford Rangers. He was released by Port Vale in May 2018 and joined Leek Town via Stafford Rangers later in the year.

Career

Port Vale
Reeves graduated through the Port Vale Academy to sign professional forms in April 2015. He joined Northern Premier League Division One North side Witton Albion on a one-month loan in November 2015. His loan was extended after he established himself in the first team and he went on to make 14 appearances, scoring one goal in a 5–0 win over Harrogate Railway Athletic on 2 January. He then joined Hyde United on a one-month loan in February 2016. He also made 14 appearances for Hyde, as the club were relegated out of the Northern Premier League Premier Division.

On 16 September 2016, he returned to Witton Albion – now playing in the Northern Premier League Division One South – on a 28-day loan. He returned to Witton Albion on loan in mid-November, but played just two games before being sidelined with injury. He joined Stafford Rangers of the Northern Premier League Premier Division on a 28-day loan on 3 February 2017. He made his EFL League One debut for Port Vale after coming on as a 47th-minute substitute for Danny Pugh in a 1–1 draw with Southend United at Roots Hall on 4 March. After two further substitute appearances that month he thanked central midfield partner Sam Foley and caretaker-manager Michael Brown for helping him to adapt to League One football. He went on to feature in 12 of the club's final 14 games of the 2016–17 relegation campaign, and signed a new one-year contract in May 2017.

On 7 November 2017, he scored his first goal in professional football in a 4–2 victory over Crewe Alexandra in an EFL Trophy group stage match at Vale Park. However he featured just eight times for the "Valiants" during the 2017–18 campaign and was not retained by new manager Neil Aspin in May 2018.

Non-League
On 14 August 2018, Reeves joined Stafford Rangers on a short-term contract. On 25 September 2018, he moved on to Northern Premier League Division One West club Leek Town after manager Neil Baker lost six players to injury. The "Blues" reached the play-offs at the end of the 2018–19 season, but lost 2–1 to Radcliffe in the final. The 2019–20 season was formally abandoned due to the COVID-19 pandemic in England, with no promotions taking place despite Leek sitting top of the Division One South East table. He featured ten times in the 2020–21 campaign, and was sent off in a 1–0 defeat at Kidsgrove Athletic, before the season was curtailed early due to the ongoing pandemic. He played just five games in the 2021–22 season.

Style of play
The Port Vale website described Reeves as an "energetic technical midfielder". Port Vale youth team coach Mick Ede said that: "he is a powerful player who is good with the ball at his feet".

Career statistics

References

1996 births
Living people
Footballers from Wrexham
Welsh footballers
Association football midfielders
Port Vale F.C. players
Witton Albion F.C. players
Hyde United F.C. players
Stafford Rangers F.C. players
Leek Town F.C. players
Northern Premier League players
English Football League players